Kvemo-Bakarta or Kvemo-Bakarda is a hamlet in the Dzau district of South Ossetia.

See also
 Dzau district

References 

Populated places in Dzau District